Berkay Ateş (born 19 February 1987) is a Turkish actor.

Life and career  
Ateş was born on 19 February 1987 in Istanbul. His mother is from Malatya while his father is from Ardahan. He is a graduate of Mimar Sinan Fine Arts University with a degree in theatre studies. He made his cinematic debut with the movie Yarım Kalan Mucize.

In 2015, he received the Promising Young Actor Award at the 22nd International Adana Film Festival for his role in the movie Abluka. He simultaneously continued his career on stage before making his television debut in 2016 with a role in İstanbul Sokakları. He was further recognized for his role in the TV series Anne, but role to prominence with his role as Mahsun in Çukur and Ozan Akınsel in Alev Alev.

Filmography

Film

Television

İnternet

Theatre

Awards

References

External links

Turkish male television actors
Turkish male film actors
1987 births
Living people
Turkish male stage actors
Male actors from Istanbul